

Codes 

Y